Haggardstown is a townland and a civil parish located on the outskirts of Dundalk, County Louth, Ireland. The civil parish of Haggardstown lies on the shore of Dundalk Bay, north of the estuary of the River Fane, and includes the village of Blackrock.

Education 

There are three primary-level schools in the Haggardstown-Blackrock area, one of them located in Haggardstown itself. There are no second-level education facilities in Haggardstown or Blackrock.

Religion 
Haggardstown has a large Roman Catholic church (dating from 1923), to which is attached a large adjoining cemetery. There is also a Church of Ireland church (dating from 1827) in Haynestown, a townland southwest of Haggardstown.

Transport 
Haggardstown is located along the R132, known locally as the Old Dublin Road, which traverses the western part of the townland. Haggardstown is approximately 5 km from Dundalk railway station. The M1 Motorway, which connects the Dundalk area with Newry and Dublin, is also close by. A number of bus services, with stops along the R132, run through Haggardstown.

Sport

Geraldines GFC is the local Gaelic football team. The club has won the Louth Senior Football Championship five times.

Notable people
Gerard Hoey, Louth senior county footballer

References

Townlands of County Louth